Ephrin-B2 is a protein that in humans is encoded by the EFNB2 gene.

Function 

This gene encodes a member of the ephrin (EPH) family. The ephrins and EPH-related receptors comprise the largest subfamily of receptor protein-tyrosine kinases and have been implicated in mediating developmental events, especially in the nervous system and in erythropoiesis. Based on their structures and sequence relationships, ephrins are divided into the ephrin-A (EFNA) class, which are anchored to the membrane by a glycosylphosphatidylinositol linkage, and the ephrin-B (EFNB) class, which are transmembrane proteins. This gene encodes an EFNB class ephrin which binds to the EPHB4 and EPHA3 receptors.

Cancer 
EFNB2 gene has been observed progressively downregulated in Human papillomavirus-positive neoplastic keratinocytes derived from uterine cervical preneoplastic lesions at different levels of malignancy. For this reason, EFNB2 is likely to be associated with tumorigenesis and may be a potential prognostic marker for uterine cervical preneoplastic lesions progression.

Interactions 

EFNB2 has been shown to interact with EPHA3 and EPHB1 in optic chiasm development.

EFNB2 has also been shown to serve as a receptor for Hendra Virus and Nipah Virus, mediating entry into the cell during infection.

References

Further reading